Miaenia fujiyamai is a species of beetle in the family Cerambycidae. It was described by Shōnen Matsumura and Masaki Matsushita in 1933.

References

Miaenia
Beetles described in 1933